Talybont Reservoir is the largest stillwater reservoir in the central Brecon Beacons at .

Construction of the current dam started in 1931 by Newport Corporation, and in 1939 the reservoir started supplying Newport with treated water.

The reservoir is now owned by Welsh Water. In 2019 a £10 million modernisation took place, including upgrading the pipework inside the dam.

References

External links 
Talybont Reservoir and Forest, Brecon Beacons National Park
www.geograph.co.uk photos of Talybont reservoir and surrounding area

Reservoirs in Powys
Dams in Powys
Reservoirs in the Brecon Beacons National Park